"I Will Buy You a New Life" is a rock song by American rock band Everclear from their third studio album, So Much for the Afterglow (1997). The song peaked at number three on the US Billboard Hot Modern Rock Tracks chart, number 20 on the Billboard Hot Adult Top 40 Tracks chart, and number 31 on the Billboard Top 40 Mainstream chart. In Canada, the song peaked at number 49 on the RPM Top Singles chart and number one on the RPM Alternative 30 chart.

Content
In an October 2003 interview with Songfacts, lead singer Art Alexakis said:

Track listings
US 7-inch jukebox vinyl
A. "I Will Buy You a New Life" – 3:58
B. "Like a California King" – 3:34

Australian CD single
 "I Will Buy You a New Life"
 "So Much for the Afterglow" (live)
 "Heroin Girl" (live)
 "Local God" (live)

Charts

Weekly charts

Year-end charts

References

External links
 

1997 singles
1997 songs
Capitol Records singles
EMI Records singles
Everclear (band) songs
Song recordings produced by Neal Avron
Songs written by Art Alexakis
Songs written by Craig Montoya
Songs written by Greg Eklund